Justin Rafael Turner (born March 12, 1998), nicknamed   "Juice" or "JT", is an American professional basketball player for the Grand Rapids Gold of the NBA G League. He played college basketball for the Bowling Green Falcons.

Early life and high school career
Turner was born and grew up in Detroit, Michigan, and attended Renaissance High School. As a senior, he averaged 21 points, seven rebounds, and five assists per game and was named first team All-City and second team All-State. He committed to the Bowling Green Falcons over several other Mid-American Conference schools.

College career
Turner played in four games as a true freshman before using a medical redshirt due to a season-ending injury. He was named to the Mid-American Conference (MAC) All-Freshman team and honorable mention all-conference after averaging 15.9 points per game as a redshirt freshman. Turner averaged 18.2 points, 3.7 rebounds, 3.1 assists and 1.4 steals per game and was named first team All-MAC the following season. Turner scored his 1,000th career point on a late layup to help the Falcons to a 73–69 win over Akron on February 19, 2019, part of a 23-point performance.  He initially declared for the 2019 NBA draft but withdrew after working out for several teams, returning to Bowling Green for his redshirt junior season. Turner was named first team All-MAC for a second straight season after averaging 18.8 points, 4.6 rebounds and 2.5 assists per game. After the season Turner entered the transfer portal and was widely considered to be one of the best graduate transfer players available. Turner ultimately decided to return to Bowling Green for his redshirt senior season.

On February 16, 2021, Turner became the first player in school history to surpass the 2,000 career point mark. He averaged 19.3 points and 4.4 assist per game as a redshirt senior.

Professional career

Motor City Cruise (2021–2022)
After going undrafted in the 2021 NBA draft, Turner played for the San Antonio Spurs in the 2021 NBA Summer League. Turner made his debut in an 87–58 loss against the Utah Jazz's "White" Team on August 3. He led the team with 13 points and seven rebounds along with one assist, steal, and block.

On October 23, 2021, the Westchester Knicks had selected Turner with their fourth overall pick in the 2021 NBA G League draft. On October 25, 2021, Turner was included in training camp roster of the Westchester Knicks, but was waived before the season began. On November 15, he signed with the Motor City Cruise.

Grand Rapids Gold (2023–present)
On March 2, 2023, Turner was acquired by the Grand Rapids Gold.

Career statistics

College

|-
| style="text-align:left;"| 2016–17
| style="text-align:left;"| Bowling Green
| 4 || 0 || 13.3 || .417 || .500 || .750 || 1.0 || 0.3 || 0.3 || .0 || 3.8
|-
| style="text-align:left;"| 2017–18
| style="text-align:left;"| Bowling Green
| 31 || 31 || 33.9 || .406 || .379 || .813 || 3.6 || 2.6 || 1.5 || .3 || 15.9
|-
| style="text-align:left;"| 2018–19
| style="text-align:left;"| Bowling Green
| 34|| 34 || 32.2 || .468 || .372 || .709 || 3.7|| 3.1 || 1.4 || .2 || 18.2
|-
| style="text-align:left;"| 2019–20
| style="text-align:left;"| Bowling Green
| 25 || 25 || 32.3 || .427 || .361 || .851 || 4.6 || 2.5 || 0.8 || .2 || 18.8
|-
| style="text-align:left;"| 2020–21
| style="text-align:left;"| Bowling Green
| 25 || 25 || 34.7 || .411 || .296 || .878 || 4.3 || 4.4 || 1.5 || .2 || 19.3
|- class="sortbottom"
| style="text-align:center;" colspan="2"| Career
| 119 || 115 || 32.6 || .430|| .357|| .811 || 3.9 || 3.0 || 1.3 || .2 || 17.5

References

External links
Bowling Green Falcons bio
College Statistics at Sports-Reference.com

1998 births
Living people
American men's basketball players
Basketball players from Detroit
Bowling Green Falcons men's basketball players
Grand Rapids Gold players
Motor City Cruise players
Renaissance High School alumni
Shooting guards